The second America's Cup World Series were held between 2015 and 2016 in the lead up to the 2017 America's Cup. The series was won by Land Rover BAR and confers two points towards the 2017 Louis Vuitton Cup. The runner up was Oracle Team USA which confers one point toward the next competition. The series awards points exclusively for fleet races. They were raced in AC45F catamarans, modified from the previous AC45 series to incorporate hydrofoiling capability for improved performance, in strict one-design. The design is smaller than the AC50 class that was used in the 2017 America's Cup.

Teams

Standings

References
AC45 class rule v2.4
AC45 Noticeboard
AC45 results
AC45 World Series replays

See also

2017 America's Cup

America's Cup World Series
America's Cup World Series
2017 America's Cup
America's Cup World Series